Domenico "Mimmo" Criscito (born 30 December 1986) is an Italian professional footballer who plays as a left-back for  club Genoa. A versatile player, Criscito is effective both offensively and defensively and is also capable of playing as a wing-back or centre-back, a position which he often occupied in his early career.

Criscito played for Serie A clubs Genoa and Juventus, making over 200 appearances across four spells for the former. He also played for seven years in the Russian Premier League for Zenit Saint Petersburg, making 225 total appearances and winning two league titles for the team. A full international from 2009 to 2018, he played for the Italy national team at the 2010 FIFA World Cup.

Club career

Early career
A native of southern Italy, Criscito moved up north at age 13 to pursue his football career. He started his professional career at Genoa, for whom he made his debut in Serie B in June 2003 at the age of 16. In the summer of 2004, Genoa sold 50% of Criscito and Francesco Volpe contracts to Juventus for €1.9 million, with 50% contract of Antonio Nocerino was sold to Genoa for €450,000.

Juventus
Criscito played for Juventus's Primavera team alongside Italy U-21 teammates Claudio Marchisio, Paolo De Ceglie and Sebastian Giovinco, and together they won the 2005–06 Campionato Nazionale Primavera. In the 2006–07 season, he returned to Genoa and established himself as one of the top young defenders in Serie B. In January 2007, Juventus bought his remaining 50% registration rights for €7.5 million. This was paid by the co-ownership of Masiello and Konko to Genoa, and €5.25 million cash. He also signed a new contract with Juventus that would last until 30 June 2011 and remaining on loan at Genoa.

Criscito made his Serie A debut for Juventus on 25 August 2007, in Juve's comeback game in Serie A versus Livorno, a crushing 5–1 victory. However, he endured a difficult time at the Turin club. He was deemed "too soft" to be a centre-back after Francesco Totti scored twice in six minutes in the September game, a 2–2 draw, against Roma from his side of the pitch. Criscito was substituted at half-time. After that, he found himself behind Nicola Legrottaglie and Giorgio Chiellini in the pecking order due to their outstanding form.

Return to Genoa
Not happy to remain on the bench, Criscito opted to return to Genoa on loan in the opening days of the 2007–08 winter transfer window. On 3 July 2008, he was sent on loan to Genoa again for €1 million with the Ligurian club having the option to purchase half of his contract for €5.5 million. In February 2009, he scored his first goal since returning to Genoa, the winner against Palermo. In June 2009 Genoa excised the option to sign him in a co-ownership for pre-agreed price. He was very impressive after re-joining Genoa, who were back in Serie A by then, and he retained a place in the starting line-up as Gian Piero Gasperini's first choice left-back. However, he did not rule out a return to Juventus after being linked to a permanent return to replace Fabio Grosso. In September against Napoli, Criscito was shown a straight red card for allegedly swearing at the referee after being penalized for a foul on Christian Maggio, but Gasperini later defended the 23-year-old saying that he was angry at himself, not the referee. The appeal to rescind the red card was turned down, but his ban was reduced to two to three matchdays.

On 25 June 2010, Juventus announced that the Criscito's remaining 50% registration rights were sold for another €6 million fee. However co-currently 50% registration rights of Leonardo Bonucci was signed from Genoa via Bari for €8 million.

Zenit

On 27 June 2011, Criscito signed for Russian Premier League club Zenit for €11 million fee. He penned a five-year contract with the club. He made his debut for the club on 6 August in a 2–0 away victory against CSKA Moscow, providing an assist for teammate Aleksandr Kerzhakov. He ended the season as a league champion, his first career silverware.

On 12 July 2015, he scored the winning penalty in a 4–2 shoot-out victory in the 2015 Russian Super Cup over Lokomotiv Moscow.

On 8 May 2018, he announced that he will be leaving Zenit upon the expiration of his contract at the end of the 2017–18 season. A game against FC SKA-Khabarovsk was his official farewell game for Zenit.

Third spell in Genoa
In May 2018, it was reported that Criscito had announced to sign for his former club Genoa via his personal Instagram account. His return was officially announced by the club on 24 May. A few days later he was assigned number 4 shirt.

Criscito's contract with Genoa was terminated by mutual consent on 24 June 2022.

Toronto FC
On 29 June 2022, Toronto FC announced the signing of Criscito on a TAM contract. The signing followed the arrival of former Italy teammate and good friend, Lorenzo Insigne. A move to the club was initially speculated in March 2022, but fell through. Despite receiving offers to join other Italian clubs, Criscito opted for a move to Canada to avoid playing against Genoa in the future. He made his debut for Toronto FC on 9 July against the San Jose Earthquakes in a 2–2 home draw. In the 2022 Canadian Championship Final against Vancouver Whitecaps FC on 26 July at BC Place, following a 1–1 draw, he converted a penalty in the resulting shoot-out, although Toronto ultimately lost 5–3. He scored his first goal for the club on 17 August, the equalizing goal, from a volley, of a 2–2 home draw against New England Revolution. In November 2022, he announced his retirement.

Fourth spell at Genoa
On 27 December 2022, Genoa announced that Criscito will come out of retirement and return to the club on 2 January 2023.

International career
On 14 November 2006, Criscito made his debut for the Italy Under-21 squad in a match against the Czech Republic. He appeared in two European Under-21 Championships, in 2007 and 2009, reaching the semi-finals of the latter tournament. In 2008, he also represented Italy at the Summer Olympics.

On 12 August 2009, he made his senior national team debut in a friendly against Switzerland in Basel. After a promising season, he was named in Marcello Lippi's 23-man squad for the 2010 World Cup in South Africa, where he was the starting left-back; Italy were eliminated in the first round of the tournament following a 3–2 loss to Slovakia in their final group match on 24 June.

Criscito was named to Italy's Euro 2012 squad by Cesare Prandelli, but withdrew from the team after he came under investigation due to the Scommessopoli match fixing scandal. Criscito went on to criticize the Italian FA for the decision to drop him despite the limited selection of left-backs. Several months later he was cleared of all charges.

Criscito was unused by Italy between March 2014 and May 2018, when he returned in a 2–1 friendly win over Saudi Arabia under Roberto Mancini. On 4 June, he was sent off for a foul on Ryan Babel in a 1–1 friendly draw with the Netherlands in Turin.

Style of play
Criscito was a tactically versatile player, who was capable of being both an effective attacking and defensive threat as a full-back. He began his career as a left-footed centre-back, but he was moved to the position of left-back while playing for Genoa, where he was also employed as a wing-back or as a wide midfielder on occasion under manager Gian Piero Gasperini in Genoa's 3–4–3 formation. Criscito was described as a quick defender, with good technique, distribution, and man-marking ability.

Personal life
Criscito is married to Pamela Chiccoli and they have two sons and one daughter.

Career statistics

Club

International

Honours
Zenit Saint Petersburg
Russian Premier League: 2011–12, 2014–15
Russian Cup: 2015–16
Russian Super Cup: 2015, 2016
Italy U21
UEFA European Under-21 Championship bronze: 2009

References

External links

Profile on Genoa official website
Profile  on Italian FA official website 

Profile on Zenit official website
Profile on Lega Serie A official website

1986 births
Living people
People from Cercola
Italian footballers
Footballers from Campania
Italian expatriate footballers
Genoa C.F.C. players
Serie A players
Serie B players
Italy youth international footballers
Italy under-21 international footballers
Olympic footballers of Italy
Footballers at the 2008 Summer Olympics
Italy international footballers
2010 FIFA World Cup players
Juventus F.C. players
FC Zenit Saint Petersburg players
Toronto FC players
Russian Premier League players
Expatriate footballers in Russia
Italian expatriate sportspeople in Russia
Expatriate soccer players in Canada
Italian expatriate sportspeople in Canada
Association football defenders
Major League Soccer players